Cheung Tat-ming (born 2 July 1964) is a Hong Kong actor, comedian, director and writer.

Personal life
Cheung married Ho Nim-chi, a psychiatrist, in September 2001, subsequently announcing their divorce in 2016. They had one son and one daughter.

Filmography

My Heart Is That Eternal Rose (1989)
Lee Rock II (1991)
A Moment of Romance II (1993)
Big Bullet (1996)
Troublesome Night 2 (1997)
Troublesome Night 4 (1998)
The Doctor in Spite of Himself (1999)
A Wicked Ghost III: The Possession (2002)
My Lucky Star (2003)
The Legend of Lu Xiaofeng (2006)The Luckiest Man (2008)Love in a Puff (2010)Beauty on Duty (2010)Flirting Scholar 2 (2010)Bruce Lee, My Brother (2010)The Aroma City (2011)Love Shock (2011)Scary Market (2011)The Sorcerer and the White Snake (2011)Summer Love Love (2011)Fatal Invitation (2011)Good-for-Nothing Heros (2012)Everything Is Nothing (2012)Ultra Reinforcement (2012)Happy Hotel (2012)Moonlight Love (2012)The House (2013)Hello Babies (2014)An Inspector Calls (2015)House of Wolves (2016)Quiet Now! (2016)Always Be with You (2017)Agent Mr Chan (2018)A Home with a View (2019)The Incredible Monk 3 (2019)I'm Livin' It (2019) Won – Hong Kong Film Award for Best Supporting ActorAltar Angel (2019)

TV seriesHappy Mother-in-Law, Pretty Daughter-in-Law (2010)Teen Waves (2007)Hearts of Fencing II (2004)Broadcast Life (2000)Life For Life (1999)Justice Sung II (1999)A Recipe for the Heart (1997)Justice Sung (1997)Soldier Soldier (1992)Yellowthread Street'' (1992)

References

External links
 
 
 HK cinemagic entry

Hong Kong male actors
1964 births
Living people
Alumni of The Hong Kong Academy for Performing Arts
Cantonese people
Hong Kong male comedians